Upon the Winds of Yesterday and Other Explorations is a collection of paintings by George Barr. It was published in 1976 by Donald M. Grant, Publisher, Inc. in an edition of 2,500 copies.  The book was released in commemoration of Barr being a Guest of Honor at the 34th World Science Fiction Convention.

Contents

 Foreword, by Tim Kirk
 Introduction, by Stuart David Schiff
 Illustrations
 Afterword, by George Barr

References

1976 non-fiction books
Books about visual art
Donald M. Grant, Publisher books